Doris is a British animated children's television series created by Hilary Hayton, creator of Crystal Tipps and Alistair.

Background
The programme was animated in a similar way to Hayton's previous work using cut-out images against patterned backdrops. Doris herself was a black and white cat, who had several cat friends, especially Marlon, the cat from next door. Doris was broadcast in the mid-1980s on ITV, though had very little merchandise. Puppydog Tales, a series which had a similar look to Doris, which was broadcast in the early 1990s.

References

British children's animated television shows
Animated television series about cats